The 1936 season was the Chicago Bears' 17th in the National Football League and 14th season under head coach  George Halas.  The team was able to improve on their 6–4–2 record from 1935 and finished with a 9–3 record. The team also finished in second place in the Western Division behind the Green Bay Packers. After week 10, the Bears were tied with the Packers in first place with identical 9–1 records, having split their season series. However, the club swooned at the end of the year, losing their last two games on the road to Detroit and the Cardinals. Green Bay went on to easily defeat the Boston Redskins and win the NFL title.

1936 NFL Draft

Season highlights
The Bears featured a high-powered offense with a dynamic rushing scheme and a "vertical" passing attack. Bill Hewitt starred at end, catching 15 passes for 358 yards and 6 touchdowns (this fine performance was overshadowed by that of Don Hutson, who led the league in receiving). Bernie Masterson and Carl Brumbaugh shared quarterbacking duties, although coach Halas continued to feature passing, rushing, and receiving from all the backs in his still fairly primitive T-formation scheme. As a team, the Bears averaged 18.9 yards per pass completion for 17 touchdowns. Keith Molesworth continued as a triple-threat from the halfback position. Bronko Nagurski returned to form and led the team in rushing. Rookie linemen and future hall of famers Joe Stydahar and Danny Fortmann joined tackle George Musso on the line. Rookie Ray Nolting joined the strong backfield. Jack Manders had a fine season as a rusher and kicker, scoring 4 touchdowns while making 7 of 8 field goals and 17 of 21 PATs. He was second in the league in scoring, behind the Lions' all-purpose threat Dutch Clark. The Bear defense led the league in points allowed, giving up only 94 points and allowing more than 14 points only once, to the Packers.

Future Hall of Fame players
Dan Fortmann, guard (rookie from Colgate)
Bill Hewitt, end
George Musso, tackle
Bronko Nagurski, fullback
Joe Stydahar, tackle (rookie from West Virginia University)

Other leading players
Beattie Feathers, halfback
Luke Johnsos, end
Bill Karr, end
Jack Manders, fullback/kicker
Bernie Masterson, quarterback
Keith Molesworth, halfback
Ray Nolting, halfback (rookie from University of Cincinnati)
Gene Ronzani, back

Players departed from 1935
Joe Kopcha, guard (went to Detroit)

Schedule

Standings

Chicago Bears
Chicago Bears seasons
Chicago Bears